June Alison Mummery (born ) is a British politician, and businesswoman. She was elected as a Brexit Party Member of the European Parliament (MEP) for the East of England constituency in the 2019 European parliamentary election, a role she held until the United Kingdom's withdrawal from the EU. Mummery is also the managing director of BFP Eastern Ltd, fish market auctioneers who operate in Lowestoft.

Fishing industry
Mummery is a member of the Lowestoft Fish Market Alliance (fishermen group), and is the managing director of BFP Eastern Ltd (fish market auctioneers). She bought the latter company in 2004, which also operates Lowestoft's fish market. Mummery is a founder of Renaissance of East Anglian Fisheries (REAF), a partnership between the East Anglia fishing industry and local councils. She has campaigned with the pro-Brexit group Fishing for Leave. Before her involvement in the fishing industry, she was a sales director in the engineering sector. In January 2021, she complained that the EU–UK Trade and Cooperation Agreement had left her company with no fish and that it was on its knees.

Political career
Mummery voted for Brexit in the 2016 United Kingdom European Union membership referendum. She supports Brexit as she thought that it will allow the United Kingdom to have far greater control of fishing in its waters despite having to relinquish fishing rights in foreign waters, and therefore provide an economic benefit.

She stood as a candidate for the Brexit Party in the East of England constituency in the 2019 European parliamentary election. She was third on her party's list, and was elected as one of its three MEPs in the constituency. In the European Parliament, she was a member of the Committee on Transport and Tourism, and was part of the delegation for relations with the countries of South Asia.

Homophobia
On New Year's Eve 2022, Mummery caused controversy when she appeared to espouse homophobic views in response to a supporter's tweet backing her call for Nigel Farage to be rewarded in the New Year's Honours List. The supporter's tweet suggested Farage was 'too straight, not bent... not gay [enough]' to receive such an honour, to which Mummery responded, 'Well said Jane'.

References

External links 
 European Parliament

Living people
Brexit Party MEPs
MEPs for England 2019–2020
Fishing in the United Kingdom
Year of birth missing (living people)
21st-century women MEPs for England